Sari Aghol (also Romanized as Sārī Āghol) is a village in Mah Neshan Rural District, in the Central District of Mahneshan County, Zanjan Province, Iran. The population totaled 142 among 29 families in the 2006 census.

References 

Populated places in Mahneshan County